Zürs (1717 meters above sea level) is one of the most renowned winter sports resorts in the Alps. Located in the westernmost Austrian state of Vorarlberg, almost directly on the border to North Tyrol, near the Flexenpass, Zürs is part of the Arlberg region, which also includes Lech, Oberlech, Zug, and Stubenbach. This region offers 87 ski-lifts, 200 kilometers of deep snow slopes and 305 km of ski runs. It has several (mostly luxurious) hotels and pensions, with a total of over 1,700 beds. It is popular for its downhill skiing, but also for its backcountry skiing and its Olympic skiing champions. About four kilometers north of Zürs is Lech am Arlberg, another ski resort which is linked to Zürs not only via road, but also via ski lifts and pistes.

History 
In the beginning, the mountain farmers without access roads lived under very difficult conditions in this high alpine region; they were often cut off from the outside world. With the construction of the road over the Flexenpass, the village was connected to the larger Vorarlberg/Austrian road network in 1897.  Zürs also became increasingly popular among skiers. From 1923 to 1931 several hotels and guest houses were built in Zürs. In 1938, the village already had 500 guest beds.

In cooperation with Emil Doppelmayr, Sepp Bildstein designed the first ski lift for the region. In 1937, Austria's first T-bar lift was built on the practice slope in Zürs. During the Second World War a second lift was built on the Schlegelkopf near Lech. The energetic development of the Lech-Zürs ski area with chairlifts began in the 1950s. In 1951, the lift operation at Kriegerhorn was put into operation. In 1957, the cable car Rüfikopf was finished, creating a skiing connection between Lech and Zürs. 
 The White Ring: Thanks to this new ski lift system, the famous "Weißer Ring" ski circuit running through Lech, Zürs, Zug and Oberlech was also institutionalized.
 The Green Ring: The Green Ring is a three-day hiking trail that tells the story of local people, their traditional culture, and the landscape. This LEADER-Project, with the art concept of story and installations, was created by the two artists Daniela Egger and Daniel Kocher. The trail leads the hiker on a track of legends and stories about local inhabitants and events in this multi-faceted natural landscape. Families can solve riddles about the region from Lech up to the Rud-Alpe.

Tourism & economy 
Zürs is part of the municipality of Lech am Arlberg and is one of the cradles of the skiing sport. The first ski course took place in Zürs in 1904, and the first ski lift in Austria was built in Zürs in 1937.

The main source of income is tourism. Because of the high altitude over 2,000 above sea level, the landscape is mostly free of forests and therefore offers a clear view of the surrounding alpine peaks. In addition, there is always much snow in the Arlberg-region, as well as a picture-book landscape to practice winter sports in.

From 1988 to 1994, numerous FIS Alpine Ski World Cup races were held in the Lech-Zürs ski area. After 26 years now, alpine ski races will again be held in Lech, in November 2020. The races will take place on November 14 and 15 in the Flexenarena Zürs. They will feature parallel ski races for men and women, as well as a mixed team event.

References

External links

Official website of Tourist Board Lech Zürs
Official website of Tourist Board Zürs

Cities and towns in Bludenz District
Ski areas and resorts in Austria
Tourist attractions in Vorarlberg